Laura Hubert is a Canadian rock and jazz singer. She was the lead vocalist for the alternative rock group Leslie Spit Treeo in the 1980s and 1990s, and has subsequently released three solo jazz CDs.

Discography
 My Girlish Ways (2001)
 Live at the Rex (2002)
 Half Bridled (2004)

References

External links
 Laura Hubert

Canadian women rock singers
Canadian women jazz singers
Living people
Musicians from Toronto
Canadian alternative rock musicians
Alternative rock singers
Year of birth missing (living people)
20th-century Canadian women singers
21st-century Canadian women singers